Howard Paul Becker (December 9, 1899 – June 8, 1960) was a longtime professor of sociology at the University of Wisconsin–Madison.

Biography
Becker was born in New York in 1899, the son of Charles Becker, a New York police officer, and Letitia (née Stenson), of Ontario. His parents divorced six years after his birth. His mother married again, to Becker's brother Paul. His father Charles Becker later married twice more. He was prosecuted in New York for the 1912 murder of a gambler, found guilty, and executed in 1915.

Howard P. Becker was brought up by his mother and stepfather in Reno and Winnemucca, Nevada, where he attended local schools. He earned his undergraduate degree at Northwestern University, and completed a master's and doctorate in sociology at the University of Chicago.

Becker became a full professor of sociology at University of Wisconsin-Madison. Among his interests was exploring what he called "constructed types" of sacred and secular societies.

He is perhaps best remembered as the author of the book Man in Reciprocity: Introductory Lectures on Culture, Society and Personality (1956). This was an edited series of radio lectures on introductory sociology, a novel approach at the time. He was praised for a style described as "urbane, witty, and literate", and also for his interdisciplinary approach drawing from concepts in sociology, social psychology, and anthropology. His book was also described as presenting a "coherent view of sociology" in a "vigorous and idiosyncratic manner".

Among graduate students whom Becker advised was C. Wright Mills, when he was completing his doctoral thesis at Wisconsin-Madison. Mills later said that he was not happy with Becker's role in the thesis defense. He outright refused to rework his dissertation in lines with criticism from his committee.

At the time of his death, Becker had just been elected President of the American Sociological Association. His presidential address, entitled "Normative Reactions to Normlessness", was delivered by his son, historian Christopher Bennett Becker.

Becker died on June 8, 1960, of a cerebral thrombosis.

Bibliography

 Becker, Howard Paul (1946).  German Youth: Bond or Free.  New York: Oxford University Press, 1946. Detailed history and sociology of the various aspects of the youth movement. Remarkable for the times, the discussion of homoeroticism and homosexuality within some of these groups is non-judgmental. OCLC 2083809 In 1998, Routledge reprinted this work as Volume 8 of its International Library of Sociology and The Sociology of Youth and Adolescence series. OCLC 761549797

References

External links

1899 births
1960 deaths
American sociologists
Presidents of the American Sociological Association
University of Wisconsin–Madison faculty
People from Winnemucca, Nevada